Gochang O clan was one of the Korean clans. Their Bon-gwan was in Gochang County, North Jeolla Province. According to the research in 2000, the number of Gochang O clan was 16716. Their founder was O Hak rin. He was a Hanlin Academy during Jeongjong, 10th monarch of Goryeo’s reign in Goryeo dynasty and a descendant of O Cheom who came over from China to Silla during Jijeung of Silla’s reign in Silla dynasty.

See also 
 Korean clan names of foreign origin

References

External links 
 

 
Korean clan names of Chinese origin